Hills and Dales Historic District is a national historic district located at West Lafayette, Tippecanoe County, Indiana.  The district encompasses 136 contributing buildings and 39 noncontributing buildings in a predominantly residential section of Lafayette, platted in 1922–1924.  It developed between about 1911 and 1951 and includes representative examples of Colonial Revival, Tudor Revival, French Renaissance, and Ranch style architecture.  Notable contributing buildings include the Haniford House (1911, 1919), Herbert Graves House, (c. 1938–1939), and Marion J. Eaton House (c. 1940–1941).

It was listed on the National Register of Historic Places in 2002.

See also
Chauncey-Stadium Avenues Historic District
Happy Hollow Heights Historic District

References

Neighborhoods in West Lafayette, Indiana
Historic districts on the National Register of Historic Places in Indiana
Renaissance Revival architecture in Indiana
Tudor Revival architecture in Indiana
Colonial Revival architecture in Indiana
Historic districts in West Lafayette, Indiana
National Register of Historic Places in Tippecanoe County, Indiana
2002 establishments in Indiana